Sanjin Lelić (born 11 January 1997) is a Bosnian-Herzegovinian professional footballer who plays as a winger.

Club career
He had a spell with Slovenian side Rudar Velenje in 2020.

References

External links
 

1997 births
Living people
Footballers from Sarajevo
Bosnia and Herzegovina footballers
Bosnia and Herzegovina youth international footballers
Association football wingers
FC Ingolstadt 04 II players
FK Olimpik players
FK Sarajevo players
NK Čelik Zenica players
K.S.V. Roeselare players
NK Rudar Velenje players
Regionalliga players
Premier League of Bosnia and Herzegovina players
Slovenian PrvaLiga players
Slovenian Second League players
Bosnia and Herzegovina expatriate footballers
Expatriate footballers in Germany
Bosnia and Herzegovina expatriate sportspeople in Germany
Expatriate footballers in Belgium
Bosnia and Herzegovina expatriate sportspeople in Belgium
Expatriate footballers in Slovenia
Bosnia and Herzegovina expatriate sportspeople in Slovenia